Orgalim (derived originally from the French Organisme de Liaison des Industries Métalliques Européennes) represents Europe's technology industries, comprising 770,000 companies spanning the mechanical, electrical and electronics, and metal technology branches. The industry employs about 10.97 million people in Europe, generating an annual turnover of €2,497 billion and represents one-third of the manufactured exports of the European Union. Since November 2019, Rada Rodriguez, CEO of Signify GmbH, has been the President of Orgalim.

History
Orgalim was formally created in late 1954, therefore pre-dating the official European Union project. Founding associations came from Austria, Belgium, France, West Germany, Italy, the Netherlands, Switzerland, the UK, Sweden, Finland, Denmark and Norway. Meetings and informal collaboration between industries had begun in 1948, and although initially created as an informal club without any financial demands, the organisation became increasingly structured and eventually developed a secretariat in the early 1950s. Various other engineering groups had been created at the same time as the European Coal and Steel Community developed, such as MEFTA and COLIME. Orgalim members decided in 1960 to incorporate the groups into Orgalim as working groups.

Orgalime has since been registered on the Transparency Register operated jointly by the European Commission and the European Parliament.

Overview
Orgalim is a European-level federation that engages with EU policymakers on behalf of its membership, speaking for 29 national industry associations and 20 European sector associations. Orgalim's advocacy work addresses a broad spectrum of policy and regulatory issues from digital transformation and trade to Internal Market and environment policies.

As part of its service, Orgalim publishes legal publications to provide companies with contractual solutions for business-to-business relations – with use cases ranging from product supply, product installation, repair and maintenance, to agency contracts and distributor abroad contracts.

Orgalim is a member of the Alliance for a Competitive European Industry (ACEI) and the European Forum for Manufacturing (EFM).

References

Manufacturing trade associations
Engineering organizations
European trade associations
International organisations based in Belgium